Benthonella tenella is a species of minute sea snail, a marine gastropod mollusk or micromollusk in the family Rissoidae.

Distribution
This species occurs in the Atlantic Ocean off Southeast Brazil.

Description 
The maximum recorded shell length is 9 mm.

Habitat 
Minimum recorded depth is 10 m. Maximum recorded depth is 5500 m.

References

 Lozouet, P., 2014 Occurrence of Benthonella Dall 1889 in the Cenozoic (Paleogene) of France: a present-day abyssal and bathyal mollusc (Gastropoda: Caenogastropoda: Rissoidae). Archiv für Molluskenkunde, 143(1): 21-32, 8 figures.

External links
  Serge GOFAS, Ángel A. LUQUE, Joan Daniel OLIVER,José TEMPLADO & Alberto SERRA (2021) - The Mollusca of Galicia Bank (NE Atlantic Ocean); European Journal of Taxonomy 785: 1–114

Rissoidae
Gastropods described in 1869